Valmik Thapar (born 1952) is an Indian naturalist, conservationist and writer. He is the author of 14 books and several articles, and has produced a range of programmes for television. Today he is one of India's most respected wildlife experts and conservationists, having produced and narrated documentaries on India's natural habitat for such media as the BBC, Animal Planet, Discovery and National Geographic.

Early life
Valmik Thapar was born in Bombay to Raj and Romesh Thapar, a noted journalist and political commentator who founded political journal Seminar in 1959. Noted Indian historian Romila Thapar is his aunt.

He married theatre personality Sanjana Kapoor and the couple have a son, Hamir. They live in Delhi.

Career
Valmik Thapar spent decades following the fortunes of India's tiger population. He was influenced by Fateh Singh Rathore.

His stewardship of the Ranthambore Foundation was recognised and he was appointed a member of the Tiger Task Force of 2005 by the Government of India. He criticised the majority Task Force view in his dissent note as excessively focussed on the prospects of co-existence of tigers and humans, which was, in his view not consistent with the objective of the panel.

His writings have analysed the perceived failure of Project Tiger, a conservation apparatus created in 1973 by the Government of India. He has critiqued Project Tiger, drawing attention to its mismanagement by a forest bureaucracy that is largely not scientifically trained. His most recent book The Last Tiger (Oxford University Press) makes this case strongly.

Among the consistent criticisms levelled by Thapar at India's Ministry of Environment and Forests relates to its unwillingness to curb poaching through armed patrols and its refusal to open forests to scholarly scientific enquiry.
 
His famous relationship with 'Macchli' a female tigress is documented in some of his chronicles.

His view on Ranthambore Tiger T24 transfer to Zoo 
As per the Hindustan Times 

Joining the debate on the fate of T-24 (tiger) (Ustad), Valmik Thapar, one of India's most respected wildlife experts and conservationists, said relocating Ustad was the best option: “In my 40 years of experience of the tigers of Ranthambore, T-24 is the most dangerous tiger I have ever encountered. He killed four people, including two forest guards and two locals. The local villagers were partly eaten. The forest guards were not eaten because their bodies were retrieved keeping the tiger at bay.

“After the first two kills I had suggested that this tiger be relocated to a captive enclosure but the tiger was given the benefit of the doubt. Later, two forest personnel have had to sacrifice their lives as a result. T-24 (9-years-old) territory included the path pilgrims take to and around the sacred Ganesha temple and Ranthambore fort. This last kill took place at the entry point of pilgrims and in daylight.

“The forest department and the government of Rajasthan have done a spectacularly successful job in relocating a man killing and eating tiger to a one hectare enclosure in Udaipur where he has eaten and is calm and where he will spend his last years. By doing this they have made Ranthambore safer for the brave forest guards who patrol and the tens of thousands of pilgrims who walk.

“Our feelings today must be for the families who suffered tragically in these five years that have gone by. It is for these families that we need to collect money and help. Any person or group who believed that he should have not been relocated would have to bear the responsibility on their shoulders for the next human kill and the accelerating conflict that could result. T-24 was given the maximum benefit of doubt that any man-eating tiger has ever got in recent Indian history.”

Selected TV works

Tiger Crisis
Land of the Tiger
Tigers' Fortress
Danger in Tiger Paradise
Search for Tigers
Overpopulation

Bibliography

Books by Valmik Thapar

1.	With Tigers in the Wild, Vikas Publishing, Delhi 
2.	Tiger: Portrait of a Predator, Collins UK
3.	Tigers: The Secret Life, Hamish Hamilton, Penguin, UK
4.	The Tiger's Destiny, Kyle Ceathie, UK
5.	The Land of the Tiger: A Natural History of the Indian Subcontinent, BBC Publishing, UK 
6.	The Secret Life of Tigers, Oxford University Press, Delhi
7.	Tiger, Wayland, UK
8.	Wild Tigers of Ranthambhore, Oxford University Press, India 
9.	Bridge of God: 20 Days in the Masai Mara, Private
10.	The Cult of the Tiger, Oxford University Press, India 
11.	Tiger: The Ultimate Guide, Two Brothers Press, USA
12.	The Last Tiger, Oxford University Press, India 
13.	The Illustrated Tigers of India, Oxfpord University Press, India
14.	Ranthambhore: 10 Days in the Tiger Fortress, Oxford University Press, India 
15.	Tigers and the Banyan Tree, Private
16.	An African Diary: 12 Days in Kenya's Magical Wilderness, Oxford University Press, India 
17.	The Tiger: Soul of India, Oxford University Press, India 
18.	Tigers, My Life: Ranthambhore and Beyond, Oxford University Press, India
19.	My Life with Tigers: Ranthambhore and Beyond, Oxford University Press, India
20.	Tigers in the Emerald Forest: Ranthambhore after the Monsoon, Oxford University Press, India Tiger Fire, Aleph Publishing, India
21.	Tiger Fire: 500 Years of the Tigers in India, Aleph Publishing, India
22.	Wild Fire: The Splendours of India's Animal Kingdom, Aleph Publishing, India
23.	Winged Fire: A Celebration of Indian Birds, Aleph Publishing, India
24.	Living with Tigers, Aleph Publishing, India
25.	Serengeti Magic, Private
26.	Serengeti Tales, Private
27.	Saving Wild India: A Blueprint for Change, Aleph Publishing, India

Books co-authored by Valmik Thapar
28.	With Tigers in the Wild with Fateh Singh Rathore and Tejbir Singh, Vikas Publishing, Delhi
29.	Tigers and Tigerwallahs with Jim Corbett, Billy Arjan Singh, Geoffrey C. Ward and Diane Raines Ward,  Oxford University Press, Delhi
30.	Exotic Aliens with Romila Thapar and Yusuf Ansari, Aleph Publishing

Books edited by Valmik Thapar
31.	Saving Wild Tigers, 1900-2000: The Essential Writings, Permanent Black, India
32.	Battling for Survival, Oxford University Press, India

Selected TV works
1.	Danger in Tiger Paradise
2.	Land of the Tiger – 6 one hour programmes
3.	Search for Tigers
4.	Tiger Crisis I
5.	Tiger Crisis II
6.	Tiger Zero
7.	Tigers' Fortress

Selected Public Talks in ...
1.	Auckland, New Zealand
2.	Bangalore, India
3.	Bangkok, Thailand
4.	Bristol, UK
5.	Brussels, Belgium
6.	Calcutta, India
7.	Chennai, India
8.	Colombo, Sri Lankan
9.	Dallas, USA
10.	Delhi, India
11.	Hague, Holland
12.	Jamshedpur, India
13.	Johannesburg, South Africa
14.	London, UK
15.	Male, Maldives
16.	Monaco, Monte Carlo
17.	Mumbai, India
18.	Nairobi, Kenya
19.	New York, USA
20.	Oslo, Norway
21.	Pasadena, USA
22.	San Jose, Costa Rica
23.	Singapore
24.	Sydney, Australia
25.	Thimpu, Bhutan
26.	Washington, USA
27.	Wellington, New Zealand
28.	Jaipur, India

Selected International Meetings that Valmik attended 
1.	CITES, Nairobi, Kenya
2.	National Parks Commission, Venezuela
3.	Save the Tiger Fund, Dallas, USA
4.	Tiger Meetings in Thailand
5.	CITES meeting, Hague, Holland
6.	CITES meeting TRAFIIC, Bangkok, Thailand
7.	Save the Tiger, Kathmandu, Nepal
8.	London Zoological Society, London

		*		*

References

External links
 The tiger in India: 'There is a war going on'- An exclusive interview with Valmik Thapar by the Discoverwild Foundation
 Report on Valmik Thapar from The Telegraph, India
 

Indian conservationists
Living people
20th-century Indian historians
Indian documentary filmmakers
Writers from Delhi
1952 births
Indian non-fiction environmental writers
20th-century Indian zoologists
People from New Delhi
20th-century Indian non-fiction writers